B53 or B-53 may refer to :
 B53 nuclear bomb
 HLA-B53, an HLA-B serotype
 Convair XB-53, an American aircraft